The Battle of Loncomilla was the decisive battle of the 1851 Chilean Revolution between conservative government and liberal rebel forces on 8 December 1851. The conservative victory in the battle essentially crushed the revolution. The rebel army of José María de la Cruz's was aided by Mapuche chief Mañil who participated in battle with his warriors. After defeat at Loncomilla Mañil returned south. According to historian José Bengoa Mapuches saw the government in Santiago as their main enemy, explaining thus the participation of Mapuches on the side of José María de la Cruz Concepción-based revolt.

References

Bibliography
   

Conflicts in 1851
1851 in Chile
Battles involving Chile
Battle of Loncomilla
December 1851 events
Battles involving the Mapuche